Trish Kissiar-Knight is a former head coach of the Texas Tech Red Raiders volleyball team. Knight replaced Nancy Todd who resigned on December 1, 2008. After Kissiar-Knight's departure, Don Flora became the new head coach on January 7, 2011.

References

Year of birth missing (living people)
Living people
Texas Tech Red Raiders women's volleyball coaches
Female sports coaches